Cheng Yujie (born 22 September 2005) is a Chinese freestyle swimmer. She competed in the 2020 Summer Olympics.

References

External links

2005 births
Living people
People from Jingdezhen
Swimmers at the 2020 Summer Olympics
Chinese female freestyle swimmers
Olympic swimmers of China
Medalists at the FINA World Swimming Championships (25 m)
21st-century Chinese women